The Wuhan Yangtze River Tunnel (also known as the Wuhan Changjiang Tunnel), is the first tunnel under the Yangtze River. Trial operation commenced on December 28, 2008. It takes about 7 minutes to cross the Yangtze River by car using the tunnel.

The tunnel connects Hankou and Wuchang districts in the city of Wuhan. Construction commenced in 2004.

Its length is 3630 meters.

See also
 Yangtze River bridges and tunnels

References

Road tunnels in China
Transport in Hubei